Wel Landscape Park (Welski Park Krajobrazowy) is a protected area (Landscape Park) in northern Poland, established in 1995, covering an area of . It takes its name from the Wel river.

The Park lies within Warmian-Masurian Voivodeship, in Działdowo County (Gmina Lidzbark, Gmina Płośnica).

Within the Landscape Park are four nature reserves.

Wel
Parks in Warmian-Masurian Voivodeship